Bow Road is a thoroughfare in Bow, London, England. The road forms part of the A11, running from Aldgate to Norwich in Norfolk. To the west the road becomes Mile End Road, and to the east is Bow Interchange on the A12.

The College of Technology London was located on the road, as is Bow Church, and the Lea Valley Walk passes it near to Three Mills. The Electric House carries a memorial clock to Minnie Lansbury, whose father in law  George Lansbury also lived on Bow Road

Bow Road Underground station and Bow Church DLR station are located on the road, and two further stations, both now closed, were also once situated in Bow Road: Bow railway station and Bow Road railway station.

Since 2011, Cycle Superhighway 2 has run from Stratford to Aldgate along Bow Road.

London Buses route 8 and 25 make use of Bow Road as do routes 425 and 205

Bow Road, London is home to the Thames Magistrates Court near Bow Road Underground station, as well as a number of new commercial occupiers contributing to the regeneration of East London.

References 

Streets in the London Borough of Tower Hamlets
Bow, London